The 1985–86 QMJHL season was the 17th season in the history of the Quebec Major Junior Hockey League. The league loses one of its charter members in the offseason, when the Quebec Remparts suspend operations. The remaining ten teams played 72 games each in the schedule. Gilles Courteau became president of the QMJHL on February 13, 1986.

The Hull Olympiques finished first overall in the regular season, winning their first Jean Rougeau Trophy, and won their first President's Cup, defeating the Drummondville Voltigeurs in the finals.

Team changes
 The Quebec Remparts suspend operations becoming dormant.
 The Laval Voisins are renamed the Laval Titan.

Final standings
Note: GP = Games played; W = Wins; L = Losses; T = Ties; PTS = Points; GF = Goals for; GA = Goals against

complete list of standings.

Scoring leaders
Note: GP = Games played; G = Goals; A = Assists; Pts = Points; PIM = Penalties in Minutes

 complete scoring statistics

Playoffs
Luc Robitaille was the leading scorer of the playoffs with 44 points (17 goals, 27 assists).

Quarterfinals
 Hull Olympiques defeated Shawinigan Cataractes 5 games to 0.
 Drummondville Voltigeurs defeated Chicoutimi Saguenéens 5 games to 4.
 Saint-Jean Castors defeated Verdun Junior Canadiens 5 games to 0.
 Laval Titan defeated Trois-Rivières Draveurs 5 games to 0.

Semifinals
 Hull Olympiques defeated Saint-Jean Castors 5 games to 0.
 Drummondville Voltigeurs defeated Laval Titan 5 games to 4.

Finals
 Hull Olympiques defeated Drummondville Voltigeurs 5 games to 0.

All-star teams
First team
 Goaltender - Robert Desjardins, Hull Olympiques
 Left defence - Jean-Marc Richard, Chicoutimi Saguenéens  
 Right defence - Sylvain Cote, Hull Olympiques 
 Left winger - Luc Robitaille, Hull Olympiques
 Centreman - Guy Rouleau, Longueuil Chevaliers 
 Right winger - Jocelyn Lemieux, Laval Titan   
 Coach - Pat Burns, Hull Olympiques 
Second team
 Goaltender - Vincent Riendeau, Drummondville Voltigeurs   
 Left defence - Donald Dufresne, Trois-Rivières Draveurs 
 Right defence - James Gasseau, Drummondville Voltigeurs 
 Left winger - Philippe Bozon, Saint-Jean Castors & Vincent Damphousse, Laval Titan
 Centreman - Jimmy Carson, Verdun Junior Canadiens & Michel Mongeau, Laval Titan
 Right winger - Patrice Lefebvre, Shawinigan Cataractes
 Coach - Michel Parizeau, Drummondville Voltigeurs
 List of First/Second/Rookie team all-stars.

Trophies and awards
Team
President's Cup - Playoff Champions, Hull Olympiques
Jean Rougeau Trophy - Regular Season Champions, Hull Olympiques
Robert Lebel Trophy - Team with best GAA, Hull Olympiques

Player
Michel Brière Memorial Trophy - Most Valuable Player, Guy Rouleau, Hull Olympiques
Jean Béliveau Trophy - Top Scorer, Guy Rouleau, Longueuil Chevaliers
Guy Lafleur Trophy - Playoff MVP, Sylvain Cote, & Luc Robitaille, Hull Olympiques 
Jacques Plante Memorial Trophy - Best GAA, Robert Desjardins, Hull Olympiques
Emile Bouchard Trophy - Defenceman of the Year, Sylvain Cote, Hull Olympiques
Mike Bossy Trophy - Best Pro Prospect, Jimmy Carson, Verdun Junior Canadiens 
Michel Bergeron Trophy - Offensive Rookie of the Year, Pierre Turgeon, Granby Bisons
Raymond Lagacé Trophy - Defensive Rookie of the Year, Stephane Guerard, Shawinigan Cataractes
Frank J. Selke Memorial Trophy - Most sportsmanlike player, Jimmy Carson, Verdun Junior Canadiens
Marcel Robert Trophy - Best Scholastic Player, Bernard Morin, Laval Titan

See also
1986 Memorial Cup
1986 NHL Entry Draft
1985–86 OHL season
1985–86 WHL season

References

External links
 Official QMJHL Website
 www.hockeydb.com/

Quebec Major Junior Hockey League seasons
QMJHL